Metalurgi Rustavi is a defunct Georgian football team based in Rustavi, which has twice won the national league.

In Soviet times, the club played under the name "Metalurgi" (Rustavi), then during the independence of Georgia, the club was called "Gorda" (Rustavi) and FC Rustavi.

After FC Tbilisi merged with club FC Rustavi in 2006, FC Olimpi Rustavi was established.

History
Football in Rustavi could be traced back to Metalurgi Rustavi in the Soviet era. 

In 1990, the club became a member of the newly created Umaglesi Liga under the name Gorda with Givi Nodia at the helm. In the first three seasons Gorda twice secured the bronze medals. Following Nodia's departure from the team, the management reversed its decision regarding the name. For the next six seasons Metalurgi did not achieve any significant success, although they signed several players who later joined the national team, namely Soso Grishikashvili, Zurab Menteshashvili, Aleksandre Rekhviashvili, Levan Kobiashvili. 

The club was renamed back to Gorda in 1998. Around this period the team usually stayed in bottom half of the table. In 2002, Gorda lost playoffs to Mtskheta and suffered a first relegation to Pirveli Liga. A year later, being Rustavi this time,  they prevailed over the same opponents in play-offs, but due to financial difficulties failed to obtain a top-flight license.

Before the 2006 season, it was announced that Rustavi would merge with Umaglesi Liga side Tbilisi and take part in the main division as Olimpi Rustavi. Starting from this year, Olimpi were regarded as one of the main title contenders.

In 2007, the team won their first Georgian Premier League title, followed by the second top title three years later. In the same season they recorded an unbeaten run consisting of 27 league matches. With 26 goals netted in 31 matches Anderson Aquino became the top scorer of this season. Having beaten WIT Georgia 2-0, Olimpi won the Super Cup as well. 

For the 2011–12 season the club changed its name to Metalurgi Rustavi after a thirteen-year pause. Metalurgi finished with equal points with Zestafoni and faced with a bizarre scandal involving the Football Federation. As these clubs differently inferred new league regulations determining a winner of the tournament, they both declared themselves a champion. Initially, GFF sided with Metalurgi, although after an Executive Committee extraordinary meeting held the next day, it announced a final decision in favour of Zestafoni.

Despite some decline, experienced by Metalurgi in following years, their players occasionally still featured in different post-season nominations. In one of such events in December 2014, Otar Kiteishvili was voted among three best young players.

The 2014–15 season turned out critical. Despite sitting among top five teams before the winter break, soon the overall situation rapidly deteriorated. The club had amassed debts exceeding 8₾ million and could not afford to pay salaries to its staff and players. After a fifteen-game winless run, Metalurgi ended up in the drop zone. Following a 5-0 loss to Lokomotivi in playoffs, they were relegated. 

For the last time the club played in the third tier in 2015–16, but midway through the season they withdrew from the league. Subsequently, Metalurgi were declared bankrupt. A new Rustavi club emerged representing the city in Liga 2, although they did not have any legal connections.

Honours
Erovnuli Liga
 Winners (2): 2007, 2010
 Runners-up (1): 2011-12
 Third place (4): 1990, 1991-92, 2008-09, 2010-11 
 Georgian Super Cup
 Winners (1): 2010
Football championship of Georgian SSR:
Winners (4): 1959, 1974, 1979, 1984

Seasons
{|class="wikitable"
|-bgcolor="#efefef"
! Season
! League
! Pos.
! Pl.
! W
! D
! L
! GF
! GA
! P
!Cup
!Europe
!Notes
!Manager
|-
|1990
|Umaglesi Liga
|align=right bgcolor=cc9966|3
|align=right|34||align=right|22||align=right|3||align=right|9
|align=right|63||align=right|33||align=right|69
|
|
|Gorda Rustavi
|
|-
|1991
|Umaglesi Liga
|align=right|9
|align=right|19||align=right|7||align=right|5||align=right|7
|align=right|34||align=right|22||align=right|26
|
|
|Gorda Rustavi
|
|-
|1991–92
|Umaglesi Liga
|align=right bgcolor=cc9966|3
|align=right|38||align=right|22||align=right|9||align=right|7
|align=right|71||align=right|38||align=right|75
|
|
|Gorda Rustavi
|
|-
|1992–93
|Umaglesi Liga
|align=right|7
|align=right|32||align=right|14||align=right|7||align=right|11
|align=right|73||align=right|69||align=right|49
|
|
|Metallurgi Rustavi
|
|-
|1993–94
|Umaglesi Liga
|align=right|9
|align=right| ||align=right| ||align=right| ||align=right|
|align=right| ||align=right| ||align=right|
|
|
|Metallurgi Rustavi
|
|-
|1994–95
|Umaglesi Liga
|align=right|7
|align=right| ||align=right| ||align=right| ||align=right|
|align=right| ||align=right| ||align=right|
|
|
|Metallurgi Rustavi
|
|-
|1995–96
|Umaglesi Liga
|align=right|5
|align=right| ||align=right| ||align=right| ||align=right|
|align=right| ||align=right| ||align=right|
|
|
|Metallurgi Rustavi
|
|-
|1996–97
|Umaglesi Liga
|align=right|10
|align=right| ||align=right| ||align=right| ||align=right|
|align=right| ||align=right| ||align=right|
|
|
|Metallurgi Rustavi
|
|-
|1997–98
|Umaglesi Liga
|align=right|11
|align=right| ||align=right| ||align=right| ||align=right|
|align=right| ||align=right| ||align=right|
|
|
|Metallurgi Rustavi
|
|-
|1998–99
|Umaglesi Liga
|align=right|12
|align=right| ||align=right| ||align=right| ||align=right|
|align=right| ||align=right| ||align=right|
|
|
|Gorda Rustavi
|
|-
|1999-00
|Umaglesi Liga
|align=right|12
|align=right| ||align=right| ||align=right| ||align=right|
|align=right| ||align=right| ||align=right|
|
|
|Gorda Rustavi
|
|-
|2000–01
|Umaglesi Liga
|align=right|11
|align=right| ||align=right| ||align=right| ||align=right|
|align=right| ||align=right| ||align=right|
|
|
|Gorda Rustavi
|
|-
|2001–02
|Umaglesi Liga
|align=right|10
|align=right| ||align=right| ||align=right| ||align=right|
|align=right| ||align=right| ||align=right|
|
|
|Gorda Rustavi
|
|-
|2002–03
|Umaglesi Liga
|align=right|10
|align=right| ||align=right| ||align=right| ||align=right|
|align=right| ||align=right| ||align=right|
|
|
|Gorda Rustavi
|
|-
|2003–04
|bgcolor=#ffa07a|Pirveli Liga
|align=right|4
|align=right| ||align=right| ||align=right| ||align=right|
|align=right| ||align=right| ||align=right|
|
|
|FC Rustavi
|
|-
|2004–05
|bgcolor=#ffa07a|Pirveli Liga
|align=right|11
|align=right|30||align=right|10||align=right|7||align=right|13
|align=right|39||align=right|43||align=right|37
|
|
|FC Rustavi
|
|-
|2005–06
|bgcolor=#ffa07a|Pirveli Liga
|align=right|8
|align=right|34||align=right|13||align=right|10||align=right|11
|align=right|50||align=right|37||align=right|49
|
|
|FC Rustavi
|
|-
|2006–07
|Umaglesi Liga
|align=right bgcolor=gold|1
|align=right|26||align=right|19||align=right|6||align=right|1
|align=right|57||align=right|9||align=right|63
|Round of 16
|
|FC Olimpi Rustavi
|
|-
|2007–08
|Umaglesi Liga
|align=right|4
|align=right|26||align=right|16||align=right|4||align=right|6
|align=right|26||align=right|16||align=right|52
|Quarter-finals
|UEFA Champions League 1st qualifying round
|FC Olimpi Rustavi
|
|-
|2008–09
|Umaglesi Liga
|bgcolor=cc9966 align=right|3
|align=right|30||align=right|16||align=right|9||align=right|5
|align=right|40||align=right|20||align=right|57
|bgcolor=silver|Runner-up
|
|FC Olimpi Rustavi
|
|-
|2009–10
|Umaglesi Liga
|align=right bgcolor=gold|1
|align=right|36||align=right|25||align=right|7||align=right|4
|align=right|69||align=right|26||align=right|79
|Round of 16
|UEFA Europa League 2nd qualifying round
|FC Olimpi Rustavi
|
|-
|2010–11
|Umaglesi Liga
|align=right bgcolor=cc9966|3
|align=right|36||align=right|20||align=right|6||align=right|10
|align=right|52||align=right|31||align=right|66
|Quarter-finals
|UEFA Champions League 2nd qualifying round
|FC Olimpi Rustavi
|
|-
|2011–12
|Umaglesi Liga
|align=right bgcolor=silver|2
|align=right|28||align=right|17||align=right|4||align=right|7
|align=right|39||align=right|28||align=right|55
|bgcolor=cc9966|Semi-finals
|UEFA Europa League 3rd qualifying round
|FC Metalurgi Rustavi
|
|-
|2012–13
|Umaglesi Liga
|align=right|7
|align=right|32||align=right|12||align=right|8||align=right|12
|align=right|29||align=right|35||align=right|44
|bgcolor=cc9966|Semi-finals
|UEFA Europa League 2nd qualifying round
|FC Metalurgi Rustavi
|
|-
|2013–14
|Umaglesi Liga
|align=right|5
|align=right|32||align=right|13||align=right|6||align=right|13
|align=right|35||align=right|39||align=right|45
|Quarter-finals
| 
|FC Metalurgi Rustavi
|
|-
|2014–15
|Umaglesi Liga
|align=right|14
|align=right|30||align=right|6||align=right|8||align=right|16
|align=right|25||align=right|46||align=right|26
|Quarter-finals
| 
|FC Metalurgi Rustavi
|
|}

European record
 

Notable Players
 Shota Khinchagashvili
 Kakhaber Tskhadadze
 Levan Silagadze
 Varlam Kilasonia
 Giorgi Kilasonia 
 Levan Kobiashvili 
 Nugzar Lobzhanidze 
 Nikoloz Togonidze
 Iason aladashvili
 Giorgi Sichinava
 Giorgi Gakhokidze
 Gocha Jamarauli
 Otar Kiteishvili
 Vako Qazaishvili

Managers
 Giorgi Kiknadze (July 1, 2006 – Jan 1, 2007)
 Anatoliy Piskovets (Sept 1, 2007 – Feb 1, 2008)
 Khvicha Kasrashvili
 Teimuraz Makharadze (July 1, 2008 – Oct 4, 2010)
 Nestor Mumladze (Oct 10, 2010 – Nov 1, 2010)
 Armaz Jeladze (Nov 2010 – Aug 11)
 Koba Zhorzhikashvili (Aug 9, 2011 – Oct 1, 2012)
 Georgi Kipiani (Oct 3, 2012 – May 31, 2013)
 Gela Sanaia (June 1, 2013 – Dec 31, 2013)
 Varlam Kilasonia (Jan 1, 2014–)

External links
 Official website (in Georgian)

References

 
Football clubs in Georgia (country)
Association football clubs established in 1948
Rustavi
1948 establishments in the Soviet Union
Defunct football clubs in Georgia (country)